The 1973 European Running Target Championships was the 3rd edition of the running target competition, European Running Target Championships, organised by the International Shooting Sport Federation.

Results

Men

Medal table

See also
 European Shooting Confederation
 International Shooting Sport Federation
 List of medalists at the European Shooting Championships
 List of medalists at the European Shotgun Championships

References

External links
 
 European Champion Archive Results at Sport-komplett-de

European Shotgun Championships
European Running Target Championships